Irena Machovcak (born 13 November 1968 in Prague, Czechoslovakia) is a retired volleyball player, who represented the Netherlands at two consecutive Summer Olympics, starting in 1992. 

Machovcak was one of the more experienced members of the Netherlands national team that won the gold medal at the 1995 European Championship by defeating Croatia 3–0 in the final.

References
  Dutch Olympic Committee

1968 births
Czech women's volleyball players
Dutch women's volleyball players
Dutch people of Czech descent
Volleyball players at the 1992 Summer Olympics
Volleyball players at the 1996 Summer Olympics
Olympic volleyball players of the Netherlands
Sportspeople from Prague
Living people